Sicko is a 2007 documentary film by Michael Moore. 

Sicko may also refer to:

 Sicko (band), an American rock band
 Sicko (album), a stand-up comedy album by Doug Stanhope
 Sick-O, an album by the group 3xKrazy
 Sicko, Poland
 Scott Sicko (born 1988), an American football player
 "Sicko" (Brooklyn Nine-Nine), an episode of the sixth season of Brooklyn Nine-Nine

See also
 Sick (disambiguation)
 Sickness (disambiguation)